This is a list, as yet incomplete, of Christian religious houses, both extant and dissolved, in Belgium, for both men and women. All listed so far are Roman Catholic.

A
Achel Abbey (Sint-Benedictusabdij van Achel, de Achelse Kluis or Onze-Lieve-Vrouw-van-La-Trappe-van-de-Heilige-Benedictus) (extant), part in Hamont-Achel, Limburg, Belgium, and part in Valkenswaard, the Netherlands: Trappist monks
Affligem (Flemish Brabant): 
Affligem Abbey (Abdij van Affligem) (extant) at Hekelgem: Benedictine monks
Saints Mary and Wivina's Abbey, Affligem (dissolved) (Abdij Maria Mediatrix en Sant Wivina): Benedictine nuns
Aldeneik Abbey (Abdij van Aldeneik) at Aldeneik, Maaseik, Limburg: Benedictine nuns, later canons regular
Amay, former commune of Jehay (Liège Province):
Amay Abbey (Abbaye de la Paix-Dieu d'Amay) (dissolved): Cistercian nuns (1244-1797)
Amay Priory (Prieuré d'Amay), founded in the former premises of Amay Abbey above, and later moved to form Chevetogne Abbey: Benedictine monks. The premises now accommodate the Centre de perfectionnement aux métiers du patrimoine and the Maison du tourisme Hesbaye et Meuse
Andenne Abbey (Abbaye d'Andenne) at Andenne (Namur): Benedictine double abbey, later secular canonesses
Antwerp:
Antwerp Charterhouse: Carthusians
St. Michael's Abbey, Antwerp: Premonstratensians
St. Saviour's Abbey, Antwerp (Abdij SintSalvator Antwerpen): Cistercian monks
Argenton Abbey (Abbaye d'Argenton) at Lonzée, Gembloux (Namur Province): Cistercian nuns
Assebroek, see Steenbrugge
Ath Abbey (Abbaye Notre-Dame du Refuge d'Ath) at Ath (Hainaut Province): Cistercian nuns
Aubechies Abbey (Abbaye de la Sainte-Trinité et de Saint-Géry d'Aubechies) at Aubechies (Hainaut): Benedictine monks
Aulne Abbey (Abbaye d'Aulne) at Gozée (Hainaut): Benedictine monks, then secular clergy, then Augustinian canons, then Cistercian monks
Averbode Abbey (Abdij van Averbode) (extant) at Averbode, Scherpenheuvel-Zichem (Flemish Brabant): Premonstratensians
Aywiers Abbey or Aywières Abbey (Abbaye d'Aywiers or d'Aywières), founded at Awirs but moved to Couture-Saint-Germain, Lasne (Walloon Brabant): Cistercian nuns

B
Baudelo Abbey (Abdij van Baudelo or Baudeloo) at Klein-Sinaai (East Flanders): Cistercian nuns 
Beaupré Abbey (Abdij van Beaupré) at Grimminge (East Flanders): Cistercian nuns
Beaurepart Abbey (Abbaye du Beaurepart) in Liège: Premonstratensians
Ter Beeck Abbey (Abdij Ter Beeck) at Halle-Booienhoven, Zoutleeuw, Flemish Brabant: Cistercian nuns
Béguinages (Begijnhoven) at:
Antwerp, Bruges, Dendermonde, Diest, Ghent (Old Saint Elisabeth, New Saint Elisabeth in Sint-Amandsberg and Our Lady Ter Hooyen) Hoogstraten, Lier, Leuven (Large and Small), Mechelen (Large and Small) Kortrijk, Sint-Truiden, Turnhout and Tongeren 
Bethlehem Abbey, Bonheiden (extant) at Bonheiden (Antwerp): Benedictine nuns
Bijloke Abbey, also Byloque Abbey (Abdij van der Bijloke or Abbaye de la Byloque) at Ghent (East Flanders): Cistercian monks
Bois-Seigneur-Isaac Abbey (Abbaye de Bois-Seigneur-Isaac) at Ophain-Bois-Seigneur-Isaac, Braine-l'Alleud, Walloon Brabant: Premonstratensians
Boneffe Abbey (Abbaye de Boneffe) at Éghezée (Namur): Cistercian nuns, then Cistercian monks (from 1461)
Bonheiden Abbey, see Bethlehem Abbey, Bonheiden
Bonne-Espérance Abbey (Abbaye de Bonne-Espérance) at Vellereille-les-Brayeux, Estinnes (Hainaut): Premonstratensians
Bornem, see St. Bernard's Abbey, Bornem
Braschaat Abbey (Abdij SintMichiel Braschaat) at Braschaat (Antwerp): Premonstratensians
Brecht Abbey or Abbey of Our Lady of Nazareth, Brecht (Abdij van Onze Vrouwe van Nazareth) (refoundation of the earlier house at Lier) at Brecht (Antwerp): Trappist nuns
Brialmont Abbey (Abbaye Notre-Dame de Brialmont) (extant), in the former Château de Brialmont, Tilff (Liège): Trappist nuns
Brogne Abbey (Abbaye de Saint-Gérard-de-Brogne) at Saint-Gérard (Namur): Benedictine monks (founded 919)
Bruges (West Flanders):
Augustinian Priory, Bruges (Augustijnenklooster, Brugge): Augustinian canons
Eekhout Abbey (Eekhoutabdij, Sint-Bartholomeusabdij): Augustinian canons
St. Andrew's Abbey, Bruges (Abdij Sint-Andries Brugge), now St. Andrew's Abbey, Zevenkerken: Benedictine monks
St. Godelieve's Abbey, Bruges (St. Godelieveabdij, Brugge): Benedictine nuns
St. Trudo's Abbey, Bruges (Sint-Trudoabdij, Brugge), originally in Bruges, then Male, now back in Bruges: Canonesses Regular of the Holy Sepulchre
Ten Wijngaerde Béguinage (Begijnhof Ten Wijngaerde): Beguines; from 1927 a priory of Benedictine nuns, as the Monasterium De Wijngaard
Brussels:
Coudenberg Abbey (Abbaye du Coudenberg, Abbaye Saint-Jacques-sur-Coudenberg; Abdij Sint-Jacob op de Koudenberg) in Brussels: Augustinian canons
English Ladies, Brussels (Abbaye des Dames anglaises de Bruxelles): English Benedictine nuns in exile
Jericho Priory (Klooster Jericho, Klooster Onze Lieve Vrouw ter Rosen gheplant in Jericho) in Brussels: Canonesses Regular

C
La Cambre Abbey (Abbaye de la Cambre or Abdij Ter Kameren) at Ixelles, Brussels: Cistercian nuns
Cambron Abbey (Abbaye de Cambron-Casteau) at Brugelette (Hainaut): Cistercian monks
Celles Abbey (Abbaye Saint-Hadelin de Celles-sur-Lesse) at Celles, Houyet (Namur): either Benedictine monks, or a men's collegiate foundation
Chercq Charterhouse (Chartreuse de Chercq) (dissolved) at Chercq near Tournai (Hainaut): Carthusians
Chevetogne Abbey (Abbaye de Chevetogne) at Ciney (Namur): Benedictine monks of both Latin and Byzantine rites
Chimay (Hainaut):
St. Monegonde's Abbey, Chimay (Abbaye Sainte-Monégonde de Chimay) (dissolved): Benedictine monks
Sts. Peter and Paul's Abbey, Chimay: men's collegiate foundation
Our Lady of Peace Abbey, Chimay (Abbaye Notre-Dame de la Paix de Chimay): Cistercian nuns, from 1919see also Scourmont AbbeyClairefontaine Abbey (Abbaye de Clairefontaine) near Arlon (Luxembourg): Trappist nunsCortenberg, see Kortenberg
Coudenberg Abbey, see Brussels

D
Dendermonde Abbey or Saints Peter and Paul's Abbey, Dendermonde (Sint Pieters-en-Paulusabdij, Dendermonde) at Dendermonde (East Flanders): Benedictine monks
Dieleghem Abbey (Abbaye de Dieleghem) at Dielegem in Jette (Brussels): Augustinian Canons 1095-1140, thereafter Premonstratensians
Diest, see Zelem
Dikkelvenne Abbey (Abdij van Dikkelvenne), moved to Geraardsbergen in 1081, at Dikkelvenne, Gavere (East Flanders): Benedictine monks
Ter Doest Abbey (Abdij Ter Doest) at Lissewege, Bruges (West Flanders): Cistercian monks
Doornzele Abbey (Abdij van Doornzele) at Evergem (East Flanders): Cistercian nuns
Drongen Abbey (Abdij van Drongen) at Drongen, Gent (East Flanders): Premonstratensians
Ten Duinen Abbey (Abdij Onze-Lieve-Vrouw Ten Duinen or Abdij Ten Duinen; Abbaye des Dunes) at Koksijde (West Flanders): Cistercian monks

E
Eekhout Abbey, see Bruges
Ename Abbey (Sint-Salvatorabdij) at Ename, Oudenaarde (East Flanders):  Benedictine monks
Enghien Charterhouse (Chartreuse d'Enghien) at Enghien (Hainaut): Carthusian monks 
Épinlieu Abbey (Abbaye d'Épinlieu) at Mons (Hainaut): Cistercian nuns
Ermeton Abbey (Abbaye Notre-Dame d'Ermeton-sur-Biert) at Ermeton-sur-Biert (Namur): Benedictine nuns  There are ruins nearby of an earlier monastery, of which nothing is known
Eversam Abbey (Abdij van Eversam) at Stavele (West Flanders): Augustinian canons

F
Flône Abbey (Abbaye de Flône) at Flône, Amay (Liège) - Augustinian canons
Floreffe Abbey (Abbaye de Floreffe) at Floreffe (Namur): Premonstratensians

Florennes Abbey (Abbaye Saint-Jean-Baptiste de Florennes) at Florennes (Namur): Benedictine monks
Florival Abbey (Abbaye de Florival) at Archennes (Walloon Brabant): Cistercian nuns
Forest Abbey (Abbaye Notre-Dame de Forest-lez-Bruxelles) at Forest-lez-Bruxelles (Brussels): Benedictine nuns

G
Gembloux Abbey (Abbaye Saint-Pierre et Exupère de Gembloux) at Gembloux (Namur): Benedictine monks
Geraardsbergen Abbey (Abdij van Geraardsbergen), previously at Dikkelvenne, at Geraardsbergen (East Flanders): Benedictine monks
Géronsart Abbey (Abbaye de Géronsart) at Jambes (Namur): Augustinian canons
Ghent, East Flanders:
St. Bavo's Abbey, Ghent (Sint-Baafsabdij, Gent): Benedictine monks
English Ladies, Ghent (Abbaye des Dames anglaises): English Benedictine nuns in exile
St. Peter's Abbey, Ghent (Sint-Pietersabdij, Gent): Benedictine monks
Abdij Onze-Lieve-Vrouw van het Rijke Gasthuis: Benedictine nuns
Ghislenghien Abbey (Abbaye du Val des Vierges de Ghislenghien) at Ghislenghien (Hainaut): Benedictine nuns
Gistel, see Ten Putte
Groot-Bijgaarden Abbey, also St. Wivina's Abbey (Abdij van Groot-Bijgaarden, also Sint-Wivina-abdij) at Groot-Bijgaarden, Dilbeek (Flemish Brabant): Benedictine nuns
Grandpré Abbey (Abbaye de Grandpré) at Gesves (Namur): Cistercian monks
Grimbergen Abbey (Abdij van Grimbergen) at Grimbergen (Flemish Brabant): Premonstratensians 
Groeninge Abbey (Abdij van Groeninge) at Kortrijk (West Flanders): Cistercian nuns

H
Haaltert Abbey (Abbaye Saint-Géry de Haaltert) at Haaltert (East Flanders): Benedictine monks
Ter Hage Abbey (Abdij Ter Hage, Terhagen or Tenhagen) first at Axel in the Netherlands, later in Ghent: Cistercian nuns
Hasselt Priory (Augustijnenklooster Hasselt) at Hasselt (Limburg): Augustinian canons
Hastière Abbey (Abbaye d'Hastière) at Hastière (Namur): Benedictine monks
Hemelsdaele Abbey (Abdij van Hemelsdaele) at Hemelsdaele, Bruges (West Flanders): Cistercian nuns
Hemiksem, see St. Bernard's Abbey, Hemiksem
Hérinnes Charterhouse (Chartreuse de la Chapelle à Hérinnes) at Hérinnes (Flemish Brabant): Carthusian monks
Herkenrode Abbey (Abdij van Herkenrode) at Herkenrode, Hasselt (formerly Kuringen) (Limburg): Cistercian nuns
Heylissem Abbey (Abdij van Heylissem) at Hélécine (Walloon Brabant): Premonstratensians
Hocht Abbey (Abdij van Hocht) at Lanaken (Limburg): Cistercian monks, then Cistercian nuns 
Hurtebise Monastery (Monastère d'Hurtebise) at Saint-Hubert (Luxembourg): Benedictine nuns

J
Le Jardinet Abbey (Abbaye du Jardinet) at Walcourt (Namur): Cistercian nuns to 1430, then Cistercian monks

K

Klaarland Priory or Priory of Our Lady of Klaarland (Priorij Onze-Lieve-Vrouw van Klaarland) at Lozen, Bocholt (Limburg): Trappist nuns
Kortenberg Abbey (Abdij van Kortenberg) at Kortenberg (Flemish Brabant): Benedictine nuns

L
Leffe Abbey (Abbaye de Leffe) (extant) at Leffe, Dinant (Namur): Premonstratensians 
Leuven (Flemish Brabant):
Groot Begijnhof, Leuven
Keizersberg Abbey, also Mont César Abbey (Abdij van Keizersberg, Abdij Regina Coeli, Abbaye du Mont César) in Leuven: Benedictine monks
Park Abbey (Abdij van 't Park) at Heverlee, Leuven (Flemish Brabant): Premonstratensians
St. Gertrude's Abbey, Leuven: Augustinian Canonesses
St. Monica's, Leuven: Augustinian Canonesses
St. Michael's College, Leuven: Jesuits
Vlierbeek Abbey (Abbaye de Vlierbeek) at Kessel-Lo, Leuven (Flemish Brabant): Benedictine monks
Liège:
Abbey of the Peace of Our Lady, Liège (Abbaye de la Paix-Notre-Dame de Liège): Benedictine nuns
St. James' Abbey, Liège (Abbaye Saint-Jacques de Liège): Benedictine monks
St. Laurence's Abbey, Liège (Abbaye Saint-Laurent de Liège): Benedictine monks
Lier Abbey or Abbey of Our Lady of Nazareth, Lier (Abdij van Onze Vrouwe van Nazareth) (later refounded at Brecht: see Brecht Abbey) at Lier (Antwerp): Trappist nuns
Lier, see Hemiksem
Lieu-Saint-Bernard Abbey, otherwise Abbaye Saint-Bernard-sur-l'Escaut: see St. Bernard's Abbey, Hemiksem
Lobbes Abbey (Abbaye Saint-Pierre de Lobbes) (dissolved) at Lobbes, Hainaut: Benedictine monks
Louvain-la-Neuve, see St. Gertrude's Abbey

M

Maagdendale Abbey (Abdij van Maagdendale) at Oudenaarde (East Flanders): Cistercian nuns
Maegdendael Abbey (Abdij van Maegdendael) at Oplinter (Flemish Brabant): Cistercian nuns
Malmedy Abbey (Abbaye de Malmedy) at Malmedy (Liège): administered together with Stavelot Abbey as the Principality of Stavelot-Malmedy, Benedictine monks
Malonne Abbey (Abbaye Notre-Dame de Malonne) (dissolved) at Malonne (Namur): Benedictine monks
Marche-les-Dames Abbey (Abbaye de Marche-les-Dames or Abbaye de Notre-Dame du Vivier) at Marche-les-Dames (Namur): women's community of no known order until c. 1235, then Cistercian nuns to 1856; Sisters of St. Vincent de Paul to 1880, Ursulines to 1914, Carmelite sisters to 1973; non-religious boarding school to 1980; the Little Sisters of Bethlehem to 2000; now occupied by the lay community Madonna House
Maredret Abbey (Abbaye de Maredret) (extant) at Anhée (Namur): Benedictine nuns
Maredsous Abbey (Abbaye de Maredsous) (extant) at Denée (Namur): Benedictine monks
Menin Abbey (Abbaye Notre-Dame-de-la-Paix de Menin or Abbaye des Saints-Anges) at Menen (Menin) (West Flanders): Benedictine nuns 
Merkem Abbey (Abbaye Saint-Pierre-et-Notre-Dame de Merkem) at Merkem (West Flanders): Benedictine nuns
Mesen Abbey or Messines Abbey (Abbaye Notre-Dame de Messines) at Mesen (Messines) (West Flanders): Benedictine nuns
Mons Abbey (Abbaye de la Paix-Notre-Dame de Mons) at Mons (Hainaut): Benedictine nuns
Mont César Abbey (Abbaye du Mont César), see Leuven, Keizersberg Abbey
Mont Cornillon Abbey (Abbaye du Mont-Cornillon) in Liège: Premonstratensian double house
Mont-d'Or Abbey (Abbaye du Mont-d'Or) at Wevelgem (West Flanders): Cistercian nuns
Moorsel Abbey (Abbaye de Moorsel) at Moorsel, Aalst (East Flanders): Benedictine nuns
Moulins-Warnant Abbey (Abbaye de Moulins-Warnant) at Anhée (Namur): community of women (no known rule), then Cistercian nuns 1233-1414, then Cistercian monks
Mount Thabor Convent, Mechelen (Thaborklooster): Augustinian canonesses
Munsterbilzen Abbey (Abbaye Saint-Amour de Munsterbilzen) at Munsterbilzen, Bilzen (Limburg): Benedictine nuns

N
Namur Abbey (Abbaye de la Paix-Notre-Dame de Namur) at Namur: Cistercians
Nazareth, Our Lady of, see Brecht and Lier
Nieuwenbosch Abbey (Abdij Nieuwenbosch) at Heusden (East Flanders): Cistercian nuns
Nieuwpoort Charterhouse (Kartuize Nieuwpoort), also known as Sheen Anglorum Charterhouse, at Nieuwpoort (West Flanders): English Carthusians in exile
Ninove Abbey (Abbaye de Ninove) at Ninove (East Flanders): Premonstratensians
Nivelles Abbey (Abbaye Sainte-Gertrude de Nivelles) at Nivelles (Walloon Brabant): women's collegiate foundation
Nizelles Abbey (Abbaye de Nizelles) at Ophain-Bois-Seigneur-Isaac (Walloon Brabant): Cistercian monks

O
Abbaye de l'Olive at Morlanwelz (Hainaut): Cistercian nuns
Abdij van Onze-Lieve-Vrouw ter Nieuwe Plant, see Ypres
Oost-Eekloo Abbey (Abdij van Oost-Eekloo) at Oosteeklo and later Ghent (East Flanders): Cistercian nuns
Orienten Abbey (Abbaye d'Orienten) at Rummen (Flemish Brabant): Cistercian nuns
Orval Abbey (Abbaye Notre-Dame d'Orval) (extant) at Villers-devant-Orval, Florenville (Luxembourg): Benedictine monks, then Canons Regular, then Cistercian monks, then Trappist monks
Oudenaarde Abbey (Abdji van Oudenaarde) at Oudenaarde (East Flanders): Benedictine monks
Oudenburg Abbey (Abdij van Oudenburg) at Oudenburg (West Flanders): Benedictine monks

P
Parc-les-Dames Abbey (Abbaye de Parc-les-Dames) at Wezemaal (Flemish Brabant):  Cistercian nuns
Postel Abbey (Abdij van Postel) (extant) at Postel, Mol (Antwerp): Premonstratensians
Ten Putte Abbey (Abdij Ten Putte, also Sint-Godelieveabdij) (extant) at Gistel (West Flanders): Benedictine nuns

Q
Quévy Abbey (Abbaye de Quévy) at Quévy (Hainaut): Benedictine monks

R
La Ramée Abbey (Abbaye de la Ramée) (extant) at Jauchelette, Jodoigne (Walloon Brabant): Cistercian nuns
 
Robermont Abbey (Abbaye de Robermont) at Robermont (Liège): Cistercian nuns
Rochefort Abbey or St. Rémy's Abbey, Rochefort (Abbaye Notre-Dame de Saint-Rémy) (extant) at Rochefort (Namur): Cistercian nuns to 1464, then Cistercian monks, then Trappist monks
Roesbrugge Abbey (Abdij van Roesbrugge) at Roesbrugge (West Flanders): Canonesses Regular (see also Onze-Lieve-Vrouw ter Nieuwe Plant, Ypres)
Roeulx Abbey (Abbaye Saint-Feuillien du Roeulx) at Le Roeulx (Hainaut): Premonstratensians
Ronse Abbey (Abdij van Ronse) at Ronse (East Flanders): Benedictine monks
Ten Roosen Abbey (Abdij Ten Roosen) at Aalst (East Flanders): Cistercian nuns
Roosenberg Abbey (Abdij van Roosenberg) at Waasmunster (East Flanders): Canonesses Regular
Roosendael Abbey (Abdij van Roosendael) at Sint-Katelijne-Waver (Antwerp): Cistercian nuns
Rothem Abbey (Abdij van Rothem) at Haelen (Limburg): Cistercian nuns
Rouge-Cloître Abbey (Abbaye du Rouge-Cloître, Abbaye Saint-Paul en Soignes) in Averghem (south-eastern Brussels): Augustinian canons

S

St. Andrew's Abbey, Bruges, see Bruges
St. Bernard's Abbey, Bornem (extant), formerly Bornem Abbey (Sint-Bernardusabdij, Bornem or Abdij van Bornem) at Bornem (Antwerp): Cistercian monks
St. Bernard's Abbey, Hemiksem, also St. Bernard's Abbey on the Scheldt (Sint Bernaerdts op Scheldt or Sint Bernardusabdij) at Hemiksem (Antwerp) (moved to St. Bernard's Abbey, Bornem, in 1836): Cistercian monks
Abbey of Saint-Denis-en-Broqueroie (Abbaye de Saint-Denis-en-Broqueroie) at Saint-Denis, Mons (Hainaut): Benedictine monks
St. Gertrude's Abbey (Abbaye Sainte-Gertrude de Louvain-la-Neuve) at Louvain-la-Neuve: Benedictine nuns
see also St. Gertrude's Abbey, Leuven
Saint-Ghislain Abbey (Abbaye de Saint-Ghislain or Saint-Pierre-Saint-Paul de la Celle) at Saint-Ghislain (Hainaut): Benedictines
St. Godelieve's Abbey, Bruges, see Bruges
St. Godelieve's Abbey, Gistel, see Ten Putte Abbey
Saint-Hubert Abbey (Abbaye Saint Pierre-Saint-Paul de Saint-Hubert) at Saint-Hubert (Luxembourg): Benedictine monks
St. Michael's Abbey, see Antwerp
Saint-Rémy Abbey, see Rochefort
St. Sixtus' Abbey, Westvleteren, see Westvleteren
Sint-Truiden (Limburg):
Sint-Truiden Abbey (Abdij van Sint-Truiden): Benedictine monks
St. Catherine's Abbey, Sint-Truiden (Abdij Sint-Katrien van Sint-Truiden): Benedictine nuns
Zeppern Charterhouse, see Zepperen
St. Trudo's Abbey, Bruges (Sint-Trudoabdij), formerly at Male, now back in Bruges, West Flanders: Canonesses Regular of the Holy Sepulchre
St. Wivina's Abbey, see Groot-Bijgarden
Salzinnes Abbey (Abbaye de Salzinnes) at Salzinnes (Namur): Cistercian nuns
Saulchoir Abbey (Abbaye du Saulchoir) at Kain in Tournai (Hainaut): Cistercian nuns
Scheut Charterhouse (Kartuizerkloster Scheut) at Anderlecht (Brussels): Carthusian monks 
Scourmont Abbey (Abbaye Notre-Dame de Scourmont) (extant) at Forges, Chimay (Hainaut): Trappist monks
Sheen Anglorum, see Nieuwpoort Charterhouse
Sinnich Abbey (Abdij van Sinnich) near Teuven, Voeren (Limburg): Augustinian canonesses
Soleilmont Abbey (Abbaye Notre-Dame de Soleilmont) (extant) at Gilly (Hainaut): Trappist nuns 
Solières Abbey (Abbaye de Solières) at Ben-Ahin (Liège): Cistercian nuns 
Spermaillie Abbey (Abbaye de Spermaillie) at Bruges: Cistercian nuns 
Stavelot Abbey (Abbaye de Stavelot) at Stavelot (Liège): together with Malmedy Abbey formed the Principality of Stavelot-Malmedy, Benedictine monks
Steenbrugge Abbey or St. Peter's Abbey, Steenbrugge (St-Pietersabdij Steenbrugge) (extant) in Assebroek, Bruges (West Flanders): Benedictine monks

T

Tongerlo Abbey (Abdij van Tongerlo) (extant) at Tongerlo, Westerlo (Antwerp): Premonstratensians
Tongeren Abbey (Abdij van Tongeren) at Tongeren (Limburg): Benedictine monks
Tournai Abbey (Abbaye Saint-Martin de Tournai) at Tournai (Hainaut): Benedictine monks

V
Val-Benoît Abbey (Abbaye de Val-Benoît) at Liège: Cistercian nuns
Val-du-Ciel Abbey (Abbaye de Val-du-Ciel) at Ophoven (Limburg): Cistercian nuns
Val-Dieu Abbey (Abbaye de Val-Dieu or Abbaye Notre-Dame du Val-Dieu; Abdij van Godsdal) at Aubel (Liège): Cistercian monks
Val-Notre-Dame Abbey (Abbaye de Val-Notre-Dame) at Antheit (Liège): Cistercian nuns
Val-Saint-Bernard Abbey (Abbaye du Val-Saint-Bernard) at Diest (Flemish Brabant): Cistercian nuns
Val-Saint-Lambert Abbey (Abbaye de Val-Saint-Lambert) at Seraing (Liège): Cistercian monks
Abbaye du Val-Saint-Georges, Cistercians: see Salzinnes
Val des Vierges, see Ghislenghien Abbey
Valduc Abbey (Abbaye de Valduc) at Hamme-Mille, Beauvechain (Walloon Brabant): Cistercian nuns
Vellereille-les-Brayeux, see Bonne-Esperance Abbey
La Vignette Abbey (Abbaye de la Vignette) at Leuven: Cistercian nuns
Villers-la-Ville Abbey (Abbaye de Villers-la-Ville) at Villers-la-Ville (Walloon Brabant): Cistercian monks
Vivegnis Abbey (Abbaye de Vivegnis) at Liège: Cistercian nuns
Vivier, Abbaye Notre-Dame du, see Marche-les-Dames Abbey

W
Waulsort Abbey (Abbaye Notre-Dame de Waulsort) at Waulsort, Hastière (Namur): Benedictine monks
Wauthier-Braine Abbey (Abbaye de Wauthier-Braine) at Wauthier-Braine (Walloon Brabant): Cistercian nuns
Wavreumont Abbey or St. Remaclus' Abbey, Wavreumont (Abbaye Saint Remacle de Wavreumont) at Wavreumont (Liège): Benedictine monks
Westmalle Abbey (Abdij van Onze-Lieve-Vrouw van het Heilig Hart van Westmalle) at Malle (Antwerp): Trappist monks
Westvleteren Abbey or St. Sixtus' Abbey, Westvleteren (Sint-Sixtus-Abdij) (extant) at Westvleteren (West Flanders): Trappist monks
Ten Wijngaerde, see Bruges

Y
Ypres (West Flanders):
Irish Ladies (Abbaye des Dames irlandaises d'Ypres): Irish Benedictine nuns in exile
Abbey of Onze-Lieve-Vrouw ter Nieuwe Plant (Roesbrugge Dames), formerly Roesbrugge Abbey: Canonesses Regular
St. John au Mont Abbey (Abbaye Saint-Jean-au-Mont d'Ypres): Benedictine monks

Z
Zelem Charterhouse, also Diest Charterhouse, at Zelem near Halen (Limburg): Carthusians
Zepperen Charterhouse (dissolved) at Zepperen, Sint-Truiden (Limburg): Carthusians
Zevenkerken, see St. Andrew's Abbey, Bruges
Zonnebeke Abbey (Abbaye Sainte-Marie de Zonnebeke) at Zonnebeke, Ypres (West Flanders): Benedictine nuns
Zwijveke Abbey (Abdij van Zwijveke) at Zwijveke, Dendermonde (East Flanders): Cistercian nuns

Notes

References

 Berlière, U., 1955–92 (revised edition). Monasticon Belge (7 vols, first published 1890). Bruges.
 Cottineau, L., 1939–70: Répertoire topo-bibliographique des abbayes et prieurés (3 vols). Mâcon.
 d'Haenens, Albert, 1971: Abbayes de Belgiques. Groupe Clio 70: Brussels.
 Michel, E., 1923: Abbayes et monastères de Belgique. Brussels.

 
Belgium
Monasteries